After more than a year-long hiatus, the fourth series of Arab Idol was relaunched on MBC, with its premiere on 4 November 2016. Once again, just like in the previous season, the jury was composed of singers Wael Kfoury, Nancy Ajram, and Ahlam, as well as music producer Hassan El Shafei, and Ahmad Fahmi returned as host of the show. The first four episodes covered the first round of the show, the auditions process, which took place in nine different Arab countries and, for the first time ever, in Turkey. Although thousands of hopefuls put forth their candidacy, only 64 went through to the second round of auditions in Beirut, Lebanon by the end of which, the 25 semi-finalists were picked to go through to the third round, the live show. The Palestinian contestant Yaacoub Shaheen won the title.

Judges
There was no change in judges from season held in 2014.  
The judges for the season were:
Wael Kfoury - singer from Lebanon
Nancy Ajram - singer from Lebanon
Ahlam - singer from United Arab Emirates 
Hassan El Shafei - composer, record producer from Egypt

Auditions
The candidates who qualified successfully are listed below. Each candidate is from the host country, unless otherwise stated.

Morocco
 Nisreen El Safi
 Hajar Idelhaj – she was notable because of her ability to sing in not only Arabic but also Hindi.
 Ikram Farraj
 Maysaa Aynas
 Yasmine Chellah
 Iman Foudaib
 Sakina Elhagamy
 Kaoutar Berrani
 Hamza Essaoui

Jordan
 Rawan Aalyan (Palestine)
 Muhannad Alkhatib
 Mohammed Alhawari
 Muhannad Hussein

Turkey
 Ahmed Aldosh (Syria) – disappeared before the group challenge.
 Mohammed Ben Saleh (Tunisia)
 Houssam Al Shoueikhi (Tunisia)
 Matti Sobo (Iraq)
 Fouad Al-Hitar (Saudi Arabia)

Algeria
 Mohammed Fergani – he played an Oud while auditioning.
 Manal Hadly
 Yousef Hamani
 Kawther Khawatmiya – later known as Kamelya Wared. The name change was possibly due to some conflict with judge Nancy Ajram.
 Aya Baghdadi
 Mohammed Saleh

Iraq
 Mohammed Hamza
 Asher Alwaleed
 Ayman Amin
 Houmam Abdulrazak – later known as Houmam Ibrahim. Before his stint in Arab Idol, he was already a well-known singer in Iraq, and had enjoyed minor chart success with a song, "Ma erftani" (You don't know me).
 Muhannad Jassem
 Bejan Jaza

Palestine
 Yacoub Shaheen
 Ameer Dandan
 Nader Hammouda
 Ghianna Ghantous
 Shadi Dakwar
 Nancy Hawa – disappeared before the group challenge; apparently she had voluntarily withdrawn.
 Linda Zamil
 Nadine Khatib
 Said Tarabay

Bahrain
 Abdallah Alkhelifi (from Yemen; but he told the judges he was from Saudi Arabia)
 Badr Al Hassan

Lebanon
 Mahmoud Othman (Syria)
 Aamer Sidawi
 Ibrahim Malouhi
 Tamer Daher
 Waleed Bechara
 Rabih Rabal
 Hussein al Masri
 Rabii Zayyoud (Syria) (he was first eliminated, then qualified successfully after judge Nancy Ajram decided to give him a chance)

United Arab Emirates
 Murshid Atta (Saudi Arabia) – had previously taken part in Arab Idol Season 2 and qualified. In Season 4, he qualified again, but had apparently disappeared before the group challenge.
 Amani Mubarak (Saudi Arabia)
 Ammar Mohammed (Yemen)
 Umniah Hassan (Egypt)
 Munad Abdo (Sudan)
 Bandar Mougri (Saudi Arabia)

Egypt
 Mohammed Moustafa
 Amal Ibrahim (Jordan)
 Dalia Saeed
 Omar Hamdy
 Israa Gamal
 Mohammed Said
 Samar Al Husseini
 Erfan Mohammed
 Ahmed Aljarrah

Second round 
This round began with the 64 candidates' arrival to Beirut, Lebanon. Before settling down, the beginning of the group challenge was announced to the candidates by host Ahmad Fahmi. In pre-determined groups of four to six people, these small groups had to each perform a pre-determined song in front of the jury, immediately after which, performers deemed not good enough to continue were cut from the competition. The songs chosen for this round and the results are as follows.

For the female contestants:

Group 1
Group name: Safar Al-Angham (Travel of the Melodies)
Song choice: "Galaw habibak Missafer" by Thekra
 Kaoutar Berrani (Morocco) (group leader) – Advanced
 Yasmine Chellah (Morocco) – Advanced
 Iman Foudaib (Morocco) – Advanced
 Sakina Elhagamy (Morocco) – Advanced
 Amani Mubarak (Saudi Arabia) – Advanced
This group comprised four Moroccans and a Saudi. They rendered the late Thekra Mohammed's hit song "Messafer". When their result was announced, judge Ahlam attempted to test the group members' patience by saying that "only one person" had advanced – and that person was "Safar Al-Angham", in other words, the whole group had advanced successfully. All five group members erupted into spontaneous applause.

Group 2
Song choice: "El Areeb minnak Baeed" by Najat El Saghira 
 Linda Zamil (Palestine) (group leader) – Advanced
 Samar Al Husseini (Egypt) – Advanced
 Rawan Aalyan (Palestine) – Advanced
 Hajar Idelhaj (Morocco) – Eliminated. She could be seen in tears while judge Hassan El Shafei was halfway speaking to her.

Group 3
Song choice: "Samahtak" by Assala Nasri
 Ikram Farraj (Morocco) (group leader) – Eliminated
 Maysaa Aynas (Morocco) – Eliminated. At one point while she was singing, judge Nancy Ajram was shaking her head in disapproval.
 Dalia Saeed (Egypt) – Advanced
 Israa Gamal (Egypt) – Advanced
 Rula Azar (Palestine) – Advanced

Group 4
Song choice: "Aala Bali" by Sherine Abdel Wahab
 Aya Baghdadi (Algeria) (group leader) – Eliminated
 Nisreen El Safi (Morocco) – Eliminated
 Umniah Hassan (Egypt) – Eliminated
 Amal Ibrahim (Jordan) – Eliminated
This team had a problem with the song that they chose. It turned out that the song, "Aala Bali" by Sherine Abdel Wahab, was not suited for their voices. This had a major impact on their performance and led to the elimination of all the members in this group.

Group 5
Group name: Jazairastin (Algeria and Palestine)
Song choice: "Ahou Dalli Sar" by Sayyid Darwich
 Nadine Khatib (Palestine) (group leader) – Advanced
 Ghianna Ghantous (Palestine) – Advanced
 Kamelya Wared (Algeria) – Advanced
 Amal Shaheen (Palestine) – Advanced
 Manal Hadly (Algeria) – Advanced
This team was distinguished by not only the voices of the participants, but also the commonalities that brought them together. The participants were of either Palestinian or Algerian nationality, which inspired their group name, Jazairastin – a portmanteau of "Jazair" (Algeria) and "Falastin" (Palestine). Their creative rendition of Fairuz's "Ahou Dalli Sar" ensured survival of all the members of their team to advance to the next round.

For the male contestants:

Group 1
Group name: Altuyur (Bird)
Song choice: "Walla Ya Teir" by Fadel Shaker
 Mohammed Moustafa (Egypt) (group leader) – Advanced
 Mohammed Ben Saleh (Tunisia) – Advanced
 Aamer Sidawi (Lebanon) – Eliminated
 Rabii Zayyoud (Syria) – Advanced
 Shadi Dakwar (Palestine) – Advanced
 Mohammed Said (Egypt) – Advanced

Group 2
Song choice: "Sallamtak Bi Id Allah" by Kadim Al Sahir
 Muhannad Jassem (Iraq) (group leader) – Eliminated
 Hussein Al Masri (Lebanon) – Eliminated
 Matti Sobo (Iraq) – Eliminated
 Ayman Amin (Iraq) – Eliminated
 Humam Ibrahim (Iraq) – Advanced
 Muhannad Hussein (Jordan) – Advanced

Group 3
Song choice: "Zeina Lebset Khelkhalha" by Samir Yazbek
 Mohammed Al Saleh (Algeria) (group leader) – Eliminated
 Tamer Daher (Lebanon) – Advanced
 Muhannad Al Khatib (Jordan) – Advanced
 Asher Alwaleed (Iraq) – Eliminated
 Waleed Bechara (Lebanon) – Advanced
 Saeed Tarabih (Palestine) – Eliminated

Group 4
Group name: Jalsa (Meetup)
Song choice: "Ya Munyati", popular Yemeni song 
 Badr Al Hassan (Bahrain) (group leader) – Advanced
 Abdallah Alkhelifi (Yemen) – Advanced
 Bandar Mougri (Saudi Arabia) – Advanced
 Ammar Mohammed (Yemen) – Advanced
 Fouad Al-Hitar (Saudi Arabia) – Advanced
This group was composed entirely of Gulf citizens. Their rendition of a popular Yemeni song, completely captivated the jury – so much so that judges Hassan El Shafei and Ahlam gave them a standing ovation at the end. All members of this group qualified for the next stage successfully.

Group 5
Group name: Alkhultat Alsihria (Magic Mix)
Song choice: "Aannabi" by Karem Mahmoud
 Munad Abdo (Sudan) (group leader) – Eliminated
 Omar Hamdy (Egypt) – Eliminated
 Nader Hammouda (Palestine) – Advanced
 Ibrahim Malouhi (Lebanon)- Eliminated
 Mohammed Alhawari (Jordan) – Eliminated
 Mohammed Fergani (Algeria) – Advanced
This team comprised six members, each from a different Arab country – which inspired their group name Alkhultat Alsihria (Magic Mix). They performed a song "Annabi", but their magic mix unfortunately did not captivate the jury. Out of their six members, only two – Nader Hammouda and Mohammed Fergani – successfully advanced.

Group 6
Group name: Alwahda (Unity)
Song choice: "Khallas Tarak" by Saber Rebai
 Rabih Rahal (Lebanon) (group leader) – Eliminated
 Hussein Mohammed (Egypt) – Advanced
 Bejan Jaza (Iraq) – Eliminated
 Mohammed Hamza (Iraq) – Eliminated
 Ahmed Aljarrah (Egypt) – Eliminated
 Youssef Hamani (Algeria) – Eliminated
Comprising mostly Iraqis and Egyptians, this group was the most unfortunate of the male groups – largely due to the lack of harmony and chemistry between the group members during the performance of the song. The jury decided to allow only one member of this group, Hussein Mohammed of Egypt, to advance.

Group 7
Group name: Assalam (Peace)
Song choice: "Ya Salat El Zein"  by Sayed Mekawy
 Ameer Dandan (Palestine) (group leader) – Advanced
 Kefah Rustam (Lebanon) – Advanced
 Yacoub Shaheen (Palestine) – Advanced
 Houssam Al Shoueikhi (Tunisia) – Advanced
 Mahmoud Othman (Syria) – Advanced
 Hamza Essaoui (Morocco) – Advanced
This team's rendition of a Sayed Mekawy piece, brought a rousing end to the group challenge, once again with a standing ovation from the judges, as well as all six members advancing successfully to the next round.

By the end of the group challenge, 40 contestants remained : 16 female contestants out of the original 23, and 24 male contestants out of 41. These 40 remaining competitors then had to pick one last song, from a list of 14, for their final individual challenge before the Top 24 is picked. This year, however, a maximum of six people could pick the same song, adding to the pressure competitors had to endure, as it was done on a first-come-first-served basis.

The 14 songs in the individual challenge, and the contestants who chose each song, are as follows:

"Ouli Aamalak Eih" by Mohammed Abdel Wahab
 Israa Gamal (Egypt) – Advanced
 Samar Al Husseini (Egypt) – Advanced
 Mohammed Moustafa (Egypt) – Advanced
 Mohammed Said (Egypt) – Advanced
 Nader Hammouda (Palestine) – Advanced

"Ya Tira Tiri" by Sabah Fakhri
 Houssam El Shouekhi (Tunisia) – Advanced. Judge Wael Kfoury actually joined in the singing at one point.
 Rabii Zayyoud (Syria) – Advanced
 Hussein Muhammad (Egypt) – Advanced
 Mahmoud Othman (Syria) – Eliminated. His performance was especially shocking to judge Wael Kfoury.

"El Oyoun El Soud" by Warda Al Jazairiah
 Dalia Saeed (Egypt) – Advanced
 Rawan Aalyan (Palestine) – initially eliminated, but later Advanced after the jury decided to give her a second chance
 Kaoutar Berrani (Morocco) – Advanced
 Kamelya Wared (Algeria) – Advanced

"Laila bterjaa ya layl" by Fairuz
 Nadine Khatib (Palestine) – Advanced
 Yasmine Chellah (Morocco) – Eliminated

"Eiratni belchib" by Nazem Al-Ghazali
 Houmam Ibrahim (Iraq) – Advanced

"Rasayel" by Mohammed Abdo
 Fouad Al-Hitar (Saudi Arabia) – Eliminated. Judge Ahlam appeared shocked by his performance.
 Bandar Mougri (Saudi Arabia) – Advanced

"Ahebbak law takun hader" by Talal Maddah
 Badr Al Hassan (Bahrain) – Advanced
 Abdallah Alkhelifi (Yemen)- Advanced
 Amani Mubarak (Saudi Arabia) – Eliminated
 Iman Foudaib (Morocco) – Eliminated

"Kama al Reisha" by Abu Bakr Salem
 Ammar Mohammed (Yemen) – Advanced

"Eldayia" by Sabah
 Amal Shaheen (Palestine) – Eliminated

"Emta Hataraf" by Asmahan
 Mohammed Fergani (Algeria) – Eliminated

"Weli Law Yedroun" by Moeen Charif
 Ameer Dandan (Palestine) – Advanced
 Waleed Bechara (Lebanon) – Advanced
 Tamer Daher (Lebanon) – Advanced
 Rula Azar (Palestine) – Eliminated
 Mohammed Ben Saleh (Tunisia) – Advanced

"Ma Dam Tuhibu" by Umm Kulthum
 Ghianna Ghantous (Palestine) – Eliminated

"Sawah" by Abdel Halim Hafez
 Shadi Dakwar (Palestine) – Advanced
 Muhannad Al Khatib (Jordan) – Eliminated
 Linda Zamil (Palestine) – Eliminated
 Manal Hadli (Algeria) – Eliminated

Improvisations
 Yacoub Shaheen (Palestine) – Advanced
 Muhannad Hussein (Jordan) – Advanced
 Hamza Essaoui (Morocco) – Eliminated

By the end of the individual challenge, and after the 24 competitors to advance was announced, the jury felt as though the previously eliminated candidate Rawan Aalyan deserved a second chance, and so, she was asked to come back, bringing the total number of semi-finalists to 25 (7 female and 18 male). These semi-finalists arise from 12 different Arab countries : 6 from Egypt, 6 from Palestine, 2 from Lebanon, 2 from Tunisia, 2 from Yemen, and 1 of each from Algeria, Bahrain, Iraq, Jordan, Morocco, Saudi Arabia and Syria. Each semi-finalist has their own voting number, varying from 1 to 25.

Semi-finals 

The 8 contestants who received the most votes automatically advanced to the next round. The judges were able to each select two of the remaining contestants as wild cards. Each pair would sing and then the judge would decide whom to save, advancing them to the next round.

Wild Card

*After being initially eliminated, the judges unanimously decided to save Nadine Khatib and she became the 13th Finalist.

Contestant Progress

Finals 
On finale night, February 25, 2017 Yacoub Shaheen from Palestine was crowned the winner of the fourth season of Arab Idol in a tough competition against Ameer Dandan from Palestine and Ammar Mohammed from Yemen . For the first time of Arab Idol history 2 of the last 3 contestants were Palestinian.

The finale night also had two very touching moments. The first was during the performance of the Hussain al Jassmi song "Hobilaha" (My love for her) by finalist Ammar Mohammed of Yemen, who broke down uncontrollably halfway while singing, and judge Ahlam had to come onto stage to console him.

The second was shortly before the crowning ceremony, when the 13 finalists, led by Yacoub Shaheen, Ammar Mohammed, and Ameer Dandan, got together on stage to sing a special song, "Cursed are the wars". Judge Nancy Ajram was seen in tears near the end of the song.

References

2016 Lebanese television seasons
2017 Lebanese television seasons
Idols (franchise)